Pope John Paul II Park Reservation, also known as Pope Park, is a  Massachusetts state park bordering the Neponset River in the Dorchester section of Boston. The park has been reclaimed from the former site of a landfill and the Neponset Drive-In as part of the Lower Neponset River Master Plan and the development of the Neponset River Reservation. The park is managed by the Department of Conservation and Recreation (DCR).

DCR has restored a salt marsh area and planted native trees and shrubs. The area now attracts an increased variety of birds to the habitat, including snowy egrets and great blue herons.

Activities and amenities
Trails: The park includes a number of trails for walking, hiking and running, including the Lower Neponset River Trail.
The park offers bird watching, fishing catch and release in some parts of the park , open space fields for soccer, picnicking, restrooms, and playgrounds, and it is home to many road races.

References

External links

Pope John Paul II Park Reservation Department of Conservation and Recreation
Neponset River Greenway Map Department of Conservation and Recreation

State parks of Massachusetts
Massachusetts natural resources
Parks in Suffolk County, Massachusetts
Pope John Paul II